Frank Lee Graham (November 22, 1914 – September 2, 1950) was an American radio announcer and voice actor.

Biography
Graham was born on November 22, 1914, in Detroit, Michigan to Frank L. Graham and opera singer Ethel Briggs Graham. He later traveled with his mother on tour.

He attended the University of California for one year and left to begin his acting career in Seattle, both on the stage and in radio. He was brought to Hollywood in 1937 to join KNX Radio. He had been married two years before to Dorothy Jack of Seattle. He was the star of Night Cap Yarns over CBS from 1938 through 1942 and was the announcer of dozens of programs, including the Ginny Simms, Rudy Vallee and Nelson Eddy shows.

He starred in Jeff Regan, Investigator and co-developed the radio drama Satan’s Waitin’ with Van Des Autels. Graham was also The Wandering Vaquero, the narrator of The Romance Of The Ranchos radio series (1941–1942), also on the CBS network.

One of his few live-action roles was portraying the title character in the film Cosmo Jones, Crime Smasher (1943). He had also served as a writer for the radio program upon which the film was based.

Graham voiced numerous characters in animated films for Walt Disney, MGM, Columbia and Warner Bros. He voiced the Wolf in Tex Avery's Droopy cartoons, as well as the Mouse in King-Size Canary at Metro-Goldwyn-Mayer. He provided the voices of the Fox and the Crow in the shorts of the same name at Columbia.

He was found dead at age 35 in his convertible in the carport of his home in Hollywood on September 2, 1950 with a photograph of Mildred Rossi by his side. Rossi had ended a relationship with him weeks earlier. A coroner declared he had committed suicide by carbon monoxide poisoning.

Filmography

References

External links 
 
 The Sad End of Frank Graham
 Article on The Romance of the Ranchos

1914 births
1950 deaths
1950 suicides
20th-century American male actors
American male radio actors
American male voice actors
Male actors from Detroit
Metro-Goldwyn-Mayer cartoon studio people
Radio and television announcers
Suicides by carbon monoxide poisoning
Suicides in California
University of California alumni
Warner Bros. Cartoons voice actors